Edward H. Tarrant (1799August 2, 1858) was an American politician who served the Republic of Texas and the State of Texas by fighting multiple indigenous nations for two decades. He, along with John Nealy Bryan, John B. Denton, John H. Reagan, and surveyor Warren Angus Ferris, participated in the massacre of Caddo Indians along the Trinity (Arkikosa) River. Once all native people were removed from the area Bryan was able to claim the land, divide it, and sell it, all thanks to the efforts of Gen. Tarrant. This area along the Arkikosa is now known as Dallas, TX. He also served in the Texas House of Representatives during both periods.

Tarrant County is named after him.

Early life and education
Edward was a young veteran of the War of 1812, taking part in the Battle of New Orleans (1814–15) at the age of 19, probably as a private in the Kentucky state militia. Having moved to Tennessee, he was elected a colonel of the Tennessee state militia, in the frontier environment.  By 1827, Tarrant had become a sheriff of Henry County, Tennessee, but he moved to Texas by the early 1830s and established a ranch in Red River County. He became one of the most prosperous landowners, and he owned slaves.

Career
In September 1837, Tarrant was elected to represent Red River County in the House of Representatives of the Second Texan Congress; but after a few months, he resigned to serve the republic by directing ranger activities against the Indians in 1838. In 1838–39, he served as chief justice in Red River County and was elected Brigadier-general of a northeast Texas militia unit called the Fourth Brigade. Tarrant's Indian-fighting career culminated in the battle of Village Creek, east of present-day Fort Worth, in May 1841.

In 1843, Tarrant, along with George W. Terrell, negotiated the Treaty of Bird's Fort with nine tribes of Native Americans.

Tarrant served two terms in the state House of Representatives, between 1849 and 1853. In April 1851, he married Mary Danforth. The couple resided on Chambers Creek near Italy, Ellis County, Texas.

As fighting Indians had become his specialty, in 1857, Tarrant moved part of his household to Fort Belknap in present-day Young County. He led a "go-to" fighting force to protect settlers in that locale from frequent Indian uprisings.

Later life and death
In 1857, Tarrant began moving part of his household to Fort Belknap.  On one of his journeys, General Tarrant fell ill and died on August 2, 1858, at the home of William Fondren, which is 10 miles from Weatherford, Texas, in Parker County.  He was initially interred in the William Fondren family cemetery.  On January 28, 1859, Tarrant's remains were moved to a grave on his Chambers Creek family farm in Ellis County, Texas. Tarrant's final resting place, effective March 3, 1928, is Pioneers Rest cemetery in Fort Worth, Texas, the seat of his namesake county.

His widow later married James Emerson Hawkins, settler of Midlothian, Texas.

References

Further reading

External links
 

Members of the Texas Legislature
Texas–Indian Wars
1796 births
1858 deaths
19th-century American politicians
People from Bamberg County, South Carolina
People of the War of 1812
Burials at Pioneers Rest (Fort Worth, Texas)
American militia generals
People from Henry County, Tennessee
Tarrant County, Texas